Buffalo Bill is a 1944 American Western film about the life of the frontiersman Buffalo Bill Cody, directed by William A. Wellman and starring Joel McCrea and Maureen O'Hara with Linda Darnell, Thomas Mitchell (as Ned Buntline), Edgar Buchanan and Anthony Quinn in supporting roles.

Plot
A fictionalized account of the life of William F. "Buffalo Bill" Cody, a hunter and Army Scout who rescues a US Senator and his beautiful daughter, Louisa Frederici; Federici eventually becomes his devoted wife. Cody is portrayed as someone who admires and respects the Indians. He is a good friend of Yellow Hand, who will eventually become Chief of the Cheyenne. Public opinion is against the Indians, and military leaders, politicians and businessmen are prepared to take their lands and destroy their hunting grounds for their own profit. Cody is eventually forced to fight the Cheyenne on their behalf. He meets a writer, Ned Buntline, whose accounts of Cody's exploits make him a sensation in the eastern United States and Europe. He establishes a wild west show that becomes an international sensation. His career as a performer is threatened when he takes a stand against the mistreatment of the Native American population.

Cast

Production
Parts of the film were shot in Johnson Canyon and Paria, Utah.

See also
List of American films of 1944

References

External links
 
 
 

1944 films
20th Century Fox films
1944 Western (genre) films
American Western (genre) films
Films directed by William A. Wellman
Films shot in Utah
Cultural depictions of Buffalo Bill
Cultural depictions of Theodore Roosevelt
Cultural depictions of Rutherford B. Hayes
Films scored by David Buttolph
Films with screenplays by Clements Ripley
1940s English-language films
1940s American films